Rauland may refer to:

People
Scott Rauland, an American diplomat

Places
Rauland, a former municipality in Telemark county, Norway
Rauland or Raulandsgrend, a village in Vinje Municipality in Telemark county, Norway
Rauland Church, a church in Vinje Municipality in Telemark county, Norway

Other
Rauland Corporation, also known as Rauland-Borg, an American-owned manufacturing company